Japanese pronouns are words in the Japanese language used to address or refer to present people or things, where present means people or things that can be pointed at. The position of things (far away, nearby) and their role in the current interaction (goods, addresser, addressee, bystander) are features of the meaning of those words. The use of pronouns, especially when referring to oneself and speaking in the first person, vary between gender, formality, dialect and region where Japanese is spoken.

Use and etymology
In contrast to present people and things, absent people and things can be referred to by naming; for example, by instantiating a class, "the house" (in a context where there is only one house) and presenting things in relation to the present, named and sui generis people or things can be "I'm going home", "I'm going to Hayao's place", "I'm going to the mayor's place", "I'm going to my mother's place" or "I'm going to my mother's friend's place". Functionally, deictic classifiers not only indicate that the referenced person or thing has a spatial position or an interactional role but also classify it to some extent. In addition, Japanese pronouns are restricted by a situation type (register): who is talking to whom about what and through which medium (spoken or written, staged or in private). In that sense, when a male is talking to his male friends, the pronoun set that is available to him is different from those available when a man of the same age talks to his wife and, vice versa, when a woman talks to her husband. These variations in pronoun availability are determined by the register.

In linguistics, generativists and other structuralists suggest that the Japanese language does not have pronouns as such, since, unlike pronouns in most other languages that have them, these words are syntactically and morphologically identical to nouns. As functionalists point out, however, these words function as personal references, demonstratives, and reflexives, just as pronouns do in other languages.

Japanese has a large number of pronouns, differing in use by formality, gender, age, and relative social status of speaker and audience. Further, pronouns are an open class, with existing nouns being used as new pronouns with some frequency.

Pronouns are used less frequently in the Japanese language than in many other languages, mainly because there is no grammatical requirement to include the subject in a sentence. That means that pronouns can seldom be translated from English to Japanese on a one-to-one basis.

The common English personal pronouns, such as "I", "you", and "they", have no other meanings or connotations. However, most Japanese personal pronouns do. Consider for example two words corresponding to the English pronoun "I": 私 also means "private" or "personal". 僕 carries a masculine impression; it is typically used by males, especially those in their youth.

Japanese words that refer to other people are part of the encompassing system of honorific speech and should be understood within that context. Pronoun choice depends on the speaker's social status (as compared to the listener's) as well as the sentence's subjects and objects.

The first-person pronouns (e.g., 私) and second-person pronouns (e.g., 貴方) are used in formal contexts (however the latter can be considered rude). In many sentences, pronouns that mean "I" and "you" are omitted in Japanese when the meaning is still clear.
 
When it is required to state the topic of the sentence for clarity, the particle  (は) is used, but it is not required when the topic can be inferred from context. Also, there are frequently used verbs that imply the subject and/or indirect object of the sentence in certain contexts:  (くれる) means "give" in the sense that "somebody other than me gives something to me or to somebody very close to me."  (あげる) also means "give", but in the sense that "someone gives something to someone other than me." This often makes pronouns unnecessary, as they can be inferred from context.

In Japanese, a speaker may only directly express their own emotions, as they cannot know the true mental state of anyone else. Thus, in sentences comprising a single adjective (often those ending in ), it is often assumed that the speaker is the subject. For example, the adjective  (寂しい) can represent a complete sentence that means "I am lonely." When speaking of another person's feelings or emotions, sabishisō (寂しそう) "seems lonely" would be used instead. Similarly, neko ga hoshii (猫が欲しい) "I want a cat," as opposed to neko wo hoshigatte iru (猫を欲しがっている) "seems to want a cat," when referring to others. Thus, the first-person pronoun is usually not used unless the speaker wants to put a special stress on the fact that they are referring to themselves or if it is necessary to make it clear.

In some contexts, it may be considered uncouth to refer to the listener (second person) by a pronoun.

Gender differences in spoken Japanese also create another challenge, as men and women refer to themselves with different pronouns. Social standing also determines how people refer to themselves, as well as how they refer to other people.

Japanese first-person pronouns by speakers and situations according to Yuko Saegusa, Concerning the First Personal Pronoun of Native Japanese Speakers (2009)

List of Japanese personal pronouns

The list is incomplete, as there are numerous Japanese pronoun forms, which vary by region and dialect. This is a list of the most commonly used forms. "It" has no direct equivalent in Japanese (though in some contexts the demonstrative pronoun それ is translatable as "it"). Also, Japanese does not generally inflect by case, so, I is equivalent to me.

Archaic personal pronouns

Suffixes
Suffixes are added to pronouns to make them plural.

Demonstrative and interrogative pronouns
Demonstrative words, whether functioning as pronouns, adjectives or adverbs, fall into four groups. Words beginning with ko- indicate something close to the speaker (so-called proximal demonstratives). Those beginning with so- indicate separation from the speaker or closeness to the listener (medial), while those beginning with a- indicate greater distance (distal). Interrogative words, used in questions, begin with do-.

Demonstratives are normally written in hiragana.

For more forms, see Japanese demonstratives on Wiktionary.

Other interrogative pronouns include 何 なに nani "what?" and 誰 だれ dare "who(m)?".

Reflexive
Japanese has only one word corresponding to reflexive pronouns such as myself, yourself, or themselves in English. The word  means "one's self" and may be used for human beings or some animals. It is not used for cold-blooded animals or inanimate objects.

See also
Gender differences in spoken Japanese
Japanese honorifics

References

External links

Japan Reference: Personal pronouns in Japanese
sci.lang.japan FAQ: Japanese pronouns

Pronouns

Pronouns
Pronouns by language
Pronouns